Karen Asatrian (born June 23, 1972) is an Armenian jazz pianist and a composer. His music is a synthesis of contemporary jazz and Armenian folk music. The recent album “Noor” with Karen Asatrian & Armenian Spirit band is an expression of Armenian traditional songs rearranged with a contemporary jazz style.

Early life 
Karen Asatrian received his first education in classical Violin and Piano at the Tchaikovsky Music School in Yerevan. He then continued his studies of both instruments and musical composition at the Komitas State Conservatory of Yerevan. In 1999, he moved to Carinthia, Austria, where he finalized his jazz piano studies under the direction of Harry Neuwirth, with distinction. In 2001, he graduated with a Bachelor of Fine Arts in Instrumental (Vocal) Pedagogy Studies and received a state teaching certification for jazz Piano.

Career 
Significant highlights throughout Asatrian's musical career include the initiation of the "Brahms Project" (Jazz-Trio with Chamber Orchestra) and the presentation of his original compositions with the Norbert Artner Chamber Choir. He has collaborated with The Bruckner Symphony Orchestra, Samul-Nori (Korean percussion Ensembles), Dee Dee Bridgewater, George Garzone, and Jamaaladeen Tacuma. Performances within the “Three Nights of Jazz” Festivals in Saalfelden (Austria), Jazz Festivals Wiesn in Vienna, Sziget Festivals in Budapest. Rearrangement and performance of J. Brahms compositions; numerous live studio performances, radio and TV appearances. Asatrain has also participated in several Jazz formations in the Countries of Austria, Korea, Italy, Germany, the Netherlands, Slovenia, and Armenia. In 2007, Asatrian received the Armenian Music Award in the category of Best Jazz Album for his CD "Pathway". 

In 2017, Asatrian composed the "Prayer Wheel" - a mass for Choir, Jazz-Ensemble. Premiere of the 80-minute-composition took place at the Concert Hall of Carinthia in January 2015 and was followed by further performances throughout Austria. This success was marked by the performance of Prayer Wheel within the Salzburg Festival 2016 in cooperation with the Philharmonia Choir Vienna. The latter has been recorded and released in 2017 as a CD by Skylark Production and is being distributed by Universal Music Austria. In addition to his artistic activities and performances, Karen Asatrian is a Jazz Piano-Professor at the Carinthian State Conservatory as well as at the University of Music and Performing Arts in Vienna.

Discography

Albums

As leader

As sidemen 

 Primus Sitter, Premius Sitter Five (1998, New York)
 Gabriel Lipuš, A more, 1999
 Gabriel Lipuš, Malo čezz, 2000
 Gabriel Lipuš, Čisto čezz, 2000
 Big Band Lienz, Live 2001
 Couch Ensemble, Winnetou, 2003
 Bernie Mallinger, Mallinger Open Nut, 2004
 Bernie Mallinger, Mallinger Open Nut, 2004
 Couch Ensemble, Hyper Phlegmathism, 2016

References 

1972 births
Living people
Armenian jazz pianists